James John Walrod (August 25, 1961 – September 25, 2017) was often referred to as a “design guru". A self-taught interior design consultant and collector of rare and unusual art, design and pop culture works, Walrod was also considered an expert in the field of mid century and Postmodern design.

In the 1980s, Walrod was an assistant art director for the Italian fashion house, Fiorucci. Mike D of the Beastie Boys originally coined another of his monikers “the furniture pimp”, used by the press in Rolling Stone magazine. Walrod was born in 1961 in Jersey City, New Jersey and died in 2017 in New York City of a suspected heart attack.

Projects
Walrod consulted on interiors for architects Jean Nouvel and Richard Gluckman and his collaboration with boutique hotelier, Andre Balazs, resulted in The Standard Downtown LA hotel.

Walrod worked with club and restaurant impresario team Eric Goode and Sean MacPherson. to create The Park restaurant. and after 9/11 he designed the interiors of Colors restaurant, which is operated by the former employees of the Windows on the World restaurant in the World Trade Center. Opened in 2006, Colors was "inspired by the optimism of the 1939 World's Fair", according to Walrod.

Walrod designed Nolita's Steven Alan Annex, the additions to the line of hipster fashion and lifestyle emporiums of designer, Steven Alan, completing projects in the West Village, at Steven Alan Upper West Side and NoLita.

Latterly, Walrod's commercial projects included designing Gild Hall, a business class hotel in the financial district of Manhattan, and Thompson LES Thompson LES , on the Lower East Side of Manhattan on Allen Street, for the Thompson Hotel Group.  He also co-curated a show at Cooper Union, in cooperation with the Drawing Center Drawing Center, on Paul Rudolph's drawings for a Lower Manhattan Expressway .

Additionally, Walrod worked on various residential projects featured in The New York Times, The New York Times Magazine, and Architectural Digest.

Retail and film
One of his furniture and design retail ventures in the 1990s was Form and Function in Tribeca with partners, Fred Schneider of The B-52's and Jack Feldman. For Ang Lee's 1997 film The Ice Storm, Walrod consulted on the period 1970s furniture and interiors.
In 2004, his design of the Tribeca restaurant, Pace, was featured on the television program Opening Soon on the Food Network. In May 2009 Walrod's designs for Gild Hall, a Thompson hotel in the financial district, were featured as a primary setting in director Steven Soderbergh's film The Girlfriend Experience.

See also
Rolling Stone Magazine
The New York Times Magazine
Fiorucci
Index Magazine
Mike D of the Beastie Boys

References

External links
 Jim Walrod, 1999, an interview with Index magazine
 Article on 1970's furniture,                    Details magazine
 Interview with photos, WWD
 "Wallpaper Magazine design awards" for Gild Hall
 "Fortune" magazines best business hotel award for Gild Hall
 Thompson Hotel Group website 
 "Revel in New York" , an interview with Jim Walrod and Hester Diamond
 "JimWalrod.net", contact info
 New Yorker review of Paul Rudolph museum show

1961 births
2017 deaths
American interior designers